A Shilling for Candles is a 1936 mystery novel by Josephine Tey (Elizabeth MacKintosh) about the investigation of the drowning of a film actress, known as Christine Clay. It is the second of Tey's five mysteries featuring Inspector Alan Grant, and the first book written under the Josephine Tey pseudonym. The plot draws extensively on Tey's experience in working with actors in her play Richard of Bordeaux, which was produced in London's West End in 1933 starring John Gielgud and Gwen Ffrangcon-Davies, and on her work as a contract writer in Hollywood.

Plot
The body of a woman, Christine Clay (née Christina Gotobed) is discovered at the edge of the surf on a beach in Kent. She is initially thought to be the victim of a drowning accident, but the presence of a button tangled in her hair leads Inspector Grant to conclude she has been murdered. Suspicion quickly falls on her house guest, Robert Tisdall, who admits to having stolen Clay's car and then regretted it and returned. Tisdall had been Clay's guest for 4 days at the time of the murder, in a cottage that she had rented in secret to have an anonymous holiday.  He inherited a fortune but has squandered it, and was rescued from a life of poverty when Clay randomly encountered him in London and offered him hospitality out of kindness. She did not tell him her name, instructing him to call her "Chris". Clay's identity is revealed when Jason Harmer, her songwriter, arrives at the cottage having tracked down its location from a clue in a letter he received from her. Once her identity becomes public Lydia Keats, an astrologist, receives considerable attention for having correctly predicted that Clay would drown.

The day before the murder, Clay wrote to her lawyer instructing him to add a codicil to her will bequeathing a small portion of her estate — a ranch in California and several thousand pounds — to Tisdall.  The bulk of her estate is left to "maintain the beauty of the English countryside". Tisdall claims not to have known about the bequest to him. Although it goes against his intuition, Grant is convinced of Tisdall's guilt by the motive provided by the bequest. Another suspicious circumstance is that Tisdall's coat, which had buttons similar to the one found in Clay's hair, has been stolen. Furthermore, none of Clay's friends knows of the cottage, except for her husband and the owner of the cottage, another film star.

Grant decides to arrest Tisdall, but he escapes. Later, Tisdall is discovered by Erica Burgoyne, the 16-year-old daughter of the local Chief Constable. Erica believes Tisdall's story about his coat, and sets out to find it. She discovers that a tramp was in the neighborhood on the day the coat was stolen, and tracks him through the fact that he mends china. The coat she recovers has no missing buttons, leading Grant to conclude that Tisdall is innocent. However, Tisdall cannot be found and anxiety mounts regarding his safety.

Grant is left back at square one. He next investigates Clay's brother Herbert Gotobed, who turns out to be a con man with a history of posing as a religious prophet, and Clay's husband, Lord Edward Champneis. Champneis arouses suspicion by failing to account for his whereabouts on the night before the murder, but Grant is reluctant to confront him. Grant tracks Gotobed to a monastery in Canterbury, close to Clay's cottage, where he is on the point of being given control of a large amount of money as Prior to the brotherhood's Mexican mission. Eventually Gotobed is arrested, though not for his sister's murder, and extradited to the US. Champneis's suspicious behavior turns out to be due to an effort to help a political exile to obtain sanctuary in the UK. Tisdall re-surfaces, having hidden in an attic for several days; he is feverish and on the point of pneumonia but recovers.

At a loss for the next step, Grant decides to get a haircut.  While waiting, he happens across an article in an old magazine that points out how celebrated Lydia Keats will be if her prediction of death by drowning for a film star—not identified in the article—comes true, and hints that the star should not go swimming with Keats for fear she might be tempted to make her prediction a reality. He telephones the cottage's owner and discovers that he mentioned Clay's tenancy of the cottage to Keats, forgetting that it was supposed to be a secret.  Keats has a motorboat that could have given her easy access to the beach where Clay was killed. Grant investigates and finds a coat in the motorboat that is missing a button on one sleeve. He confronts Keats.  She raves about her infallibility and the glorious destiny predicted for her by the stars, and is taken away by the police surgeon. The final scene of the book is a dinner party attended by Grant, Tisdall and the Burgoynes, at which Grant is happy to see that Erica has not become inappropriately attracted to Tisdall.

Adaptations

Film
The novel was adapted for Young and Innocent (1937) directed by Alfred Hitchcock, starring Nova Pilbeam and Derrick De Marney.

Radio
There have been various full cast adaptations for BBC Radio:

1954, adapted by Rex Rienits and produced by Charles Lefeaux. Part of the Saturday Night Theatre series.
1963, adapted by Rex Rienits and produced by Audrey Cameron. Part of the Saturday Night Theatre series.
1969, adapted by Rex Rienits and produced by Betty Davies. Part of the Saturday Night Theatre series.
1998, adapted by John Fletcher and directed by Tabitha Potts. Part of The Saturday Play series. This version dispenses with much of the plot, changes the identity of the murderer, and presents the remaining narrative as a Wodehousian romantic romp.

There have been several solo readings for BBC Radio:
1959, in 12 episodes, abridged by Donald Bancroft and read by Ronald Wilson.
2003, in two episodes, abridged by [undetermined] and read by [undetermined].
1993, BBC audiobook, unabridged and read by Stephen Thorne. Produced by Chivers Audio Books and released on cassette.

Parallels with author's life
Marta Hallard is believed to be based on Marda Vanne, whose partner Gwen Ffrangcon-Davies was the leading lady in Richard of Bordeaux. Like Christine Clay, Elizabeth MacKintosh left the bulk of her money to the National Trust.

Publication history
First published in 1936 by Methuen Publishing in London. First American edition in 1954 from The Macmillan Company, New York.  ; .

Explanation of title
Clay's will includes the bequest "To my brother Herbert, a shilling for candles".  Herbert is a con man who poses as religious. Grant comments that this bequest is the only sign of real enmity he has discovered in Clay's relationships.

References

External links
 

1936 British novels
English-language novels
British mystery novels
Novels set in Kent
Novels set in London
Methuen Publishing books
Novels by Josephine Tey
British crime novels
British detective novels
British novels adapted into films